Fabian Fernando (born 10 June 1995) is a Sri Lankan cricketer. He made his Twenty20 debut for Chilaw Marians Cricket Club in the 2015-16 AIA Premier T20 Tournament on 5 January 2016. He made his first-class debut for Lankan Cricket Club in Tier B of the 2016–17 Premier League Tournament on 6 January 2017.

References

External links
 

1995 births
Living people
Sri Lankan cricketers
Chilaw Marians Cricket Club cricketers
Lankan Cricket Club cricketers
Cricketers from Colombo